Jonathan Erlich and Neal Skupski were the defending champions but chose to defend their title with different partners. Erlich partnered Ruan Roelofse but lost in the first round to Thanasi Kokkinakis and Matt Reid. Skupski partnered Luke Bambridge but lost in the semifinals to Kokkinakis and Reid.

Kokkinakis and Reid won the title after defeating Jonny O'Mara and Joe Salisbury 6–2, 4–6, [10–8] in the final.

Seeds

Draw

References
 Main Draw
 Qualifying Draw

Nordic Naturals Challenger - Doubles
2018 Doubles